Sky Service is a charter airline, which operates several helicopters and smaller aircraft. The airline offers passenger transportation services, mostly sight-seeing flights, in the Almaty region.

Fleet 
The Sky Service fleet includes the following aircraft, as of May 2014;

References

External links 
 

Airlines established in 2004
Airlines of Kazakhstan
Helicopter airlines